Adriano Ruchini (15 April 1959) is an Italian businessman.

Ruchini was awarded with the Prize of Prizes by the Italian President in 2011. He received the award in recognition for his innovation in integrated management that allowed him to systematically improve competitiveness and business results over time.

He was invited to the National Innovation Day, which is an event designed to foster debate on issues of innovation, with particular reference to the relationship between territory, scientific research, technological development, and opportunities for young innovators. 
Moreover, in June 2011 the Innovation day was of particular importance as it coincided with the celebrations of 150 years of the unification of Italy.

He is Ambassador of Excellence EVP for EFQM, he is Licensed Advisor and Excellence Award Assessor for EFQM.

As EFQM Excellence Assessor he assessed companies as Bosch, Ricoh, Coplaning, Domino World and, in November 2011, the Astana Municipality in Kazakhstan, while in May 2012 the Worthington Cylinders GmbH. As World Excellence Assessor he did the assessment for OPI Kenya and for the Arabtech Jardaneh in August 2012.

He was the Vice President of Italo Hungarian Chamber of Commerce in Budapest. Since May 2010 he was President of the Commission Energies and Renewables at the Italian-Hungarian Chamber of Commerce in Budapest.

He achieved Executive Master of Business Administration at MIB of Trieste.

He was invited as Speaker at the Global Outsourcing Summit (GOS), in China, that is an important milestone in the development of global outsourcing. It is a very important international conference, jointly organized by APCEO and relevant governments of the main outsourcing countries. It took place in Kunming, 26–29 July 2012.

In September 2011 he was invited as VIP at the Global Economic Leaders Summit 2011 in Changchun city, Jilin province, China; while in July 2012 is attending at the Global Outsourcing Summit in Kunming City, Yunnan Province (China),
World Emerging Industries Summit (Zhengzhou, China 2013).
He has been a speaker and VIP at global international conferences, forums and summits:
Global Forum "Shaping the Future" (Trieste, Italy 2013),
Bled Strategic Forum, (Bled, Slovenia 2014),
International Culture Industry Summit, (Lanzhou, China 2014),
Congress of Entrepreneurs of Slovenia (Koper, Slovenia 2015), Convention "Which economic horizon for Italy?" (Roma, Italy 2015),
Green Mobility Show, (Venice, Italy 2015).

In May 2012 he was appointed Knight of Merit by the Sacred Military Constantinian Order of Saint George.

Since 2012 is Elite Member of Arab Business Club.

Adriano Ruchini took part as a Speaker at the Global Forum "Shaping the Future" in October 2013 in Trieste, Italy.

Initiatives
Since 2009 he started cooperating with Ambrosetti, in 2011 he was the speaker at the educational meeting "With the excellence we restart" bringing the EFQM model.

References 

Italian businesspeople
Living people
1959 births
Place of birth missing (living people)